Steven Paul Miller (born September 12, 1989) is a former American soccer player who previously played for North Carolina FC.

Career

College and amateur
Miller played five years of college soccer at Colgate University between 2007 and 2011, including a redshirted year in 2009. While at college, Miller also appeared for USL PDL club Ocean City Barons during their 2008 and 2009 seasons.

Professional
Miller was drafted in the third round (39th overall) of the 2012 MLS Supplemental Draft by Montreal Impact, but was not signed by the club. He spent 2012 with USL PDL club Michigan Bucks, before moving to Denmark to sign with Jammerbugt FC.

Miller signed with USL Pro club Wilmington Hammerheads on March 14, 2014. Miller signed with new USL club Tulsa Roughnecks on March 11, 2015.

On October 6, 2015 the Carolina RailHawks of the North American Soccer League announced that they had acquired Miller on loan from Tulsa for the remainder of the 2015 season. Miller started 5 games for the RailHawks in 2015 and on December 7, 2015 the RailHawks signed him to a multiyear contract. He appeared in 15 games for the RailHawks in 2016 and tallied 1 goal and 2 assists.

Miller is a regular guest on the popular podcast Raleigh City Sports. Miller announced on his most recent appearance that Raleigh City Sports is his official promotion/street team. Part of the partnership includes a web series with the working title "Weavin Around Raleigh" where Miller will explore different places in Raleigh.

Miller announced his retirement from professional soccer on February 15, 2021.

References

External links

1989 births
Living people
American soccer players
American expatriate soccer players
Colgate Raiders men's soccer players
Ocean City Nor'easters players
Flint City Bucks players
Wilmington Hammerheads FC players
FC Tulsa players
North Carolina FC players
Association football midfielders
Soccer players from Pennsylvania
Sportspeople from Bucks County, Pennsylvania
Expatriate men's footballers in Denmark
CF Montréal draft picks
USL League Two players
USL Championship players
North American Soccer League players